Colegio Alemán Cuauhtémoc Hank, A.C. (CACH) is a German international school in Colonia Hipódromo, Tijuana. It serves levels maternal/preschool to high school (preparatoria).

See also
 German immigration to Mexico

References

External links
 Colegio Alemán Cuauhtémoc Hank 

Education in Tijuana
German international schools in Mexico
High schools in Mexico